Kozak or Kozák is a Slavic surname literally meaning "Cossack". Notable people with the surname or name include:

 Amanda Kozak (born 1984), American beauty pageant winner
 Anna Kozak (born 1974), Belarusian sprinter
 Artem Kozak (born 1998), Ukrainian footballer
 Ashley Kozak, British jazz bassist, record producer and artists' manager
 Danuta Kozák (born 1987), Hungarian sprint canoer
 Dmitry Kozak (born 1958), Russian politician
 Don Kozak (born 1952), Canadian former professional ice hockey forward
 Ferdo Kozak (1894-1957),  Slovenian author, playwright, editor and politician
 Harley Jane Kozak (born 1957), American actress and author
 Heidi Kozak (born 1963), American actress
 Ivan Kozák (born 1970), Slovak footballer
 Ján Kozák, multiple people
 Juš Kozak (1892-1964), Slovenian writer, playwright and editor
 Les Kozak (born 1940), Canadian former ice hockey player
 Libor Kozák (born 1989), Czech footballer
 Lukáš Kozák, Slovak ice hockey player
 Marilyn Kozak, American microbiologist
 Miroslav Kozák, Slovak footballer
 Mykhaylo Kozak (born 1991), Ukrainian footballer
 Oleksandr Kozak (born 1994), Ukrainian footballer
 Petr Kozák (born 1965), Czech orienteering competitor
 Petro Kozak (1911–1984), Ukrainian clandestine Greek-Catholic hierarch, auxiliary bishop of Lviv (1983–1984)
 Primož Kozak (1929-1981), Slovenian playwright and essayist
 Rachael Kozak, Female electronic musician and Black Metal lyricist
 Richard Kozak (born 1949), Canadian politician in Manitoba, Canada
 Roman Mykolayovych Kozak (born 1957), Ukrainian politician, candidate in the 2004 Ukrainian presidential election
 Roman Yefimovich Kozak (1957-2010), Russian theatre actor and director
 Semyon Kozak (1902-1953), Soviet general
 Scott Kozak (born 1965), American football linebacker
 Syarhey Kozak (born 1981), Belarusian footballer
 Václav Kozák (1937-2004), Czech rower
 Warren Kozak (born 1951), American writer, journalist
 Zbigniew Kozak (born 1961), Polish politician

See also
 
 Kazak (surname)
 Kozakov or Kozákov
 Kazakov
 Cossack (disambiguation)
 Kossak

Slavic-language surnames
Czech-language surnames
Slovak-language surnames
Polish-language surnames